Magic Meanies is a ZX Spectrum video game developed and released by CDS Micro Systems in 1983. Magic Meanies is a clone of Universal's Mr. Do! arcade game.

Gameplay 

The player, Meltec the Wizard, digs tunnels to collect lumps of lead. To progress to the next screen, Meltec must also collect a wandering cherry and avoid roaming enemies. There are also apples embedded in the earth. Undermining these and allowing them to fall onto an enemy can kill it, or at least block a path.

Reception 
Crash magazine awarded Magic Meanies 58% in issue 2, criticising the small, jerky graphics but highlighting the skill and quick thinking required. 
Sinclair User awarded only 3 out of 10. Your Spectrum gave a score of 23 out of 30, describing it as one of the better games of this type.

References

External links 
 

1983 video games
CDS Software games
Video game clones
Video games developed in the United Kingdom
ZX Spectrum games
ZX Spectrum-only games